Superstar Kidnap is a 2015 Indian Telugu-language comedy film directed by Sushanth Reddy. The film stars Nandu, Aadarsh Balakrishna, Bhupal and Poonam Kaur. The film is about three friends who devise a plan to kidnap successful actor Mahesh Babu.

Cast 
Nandu as Nandu
Aadarsh Balakrishna as Jai
 Bhupal as Bhupal
Poonam Kaur as Priya
Tejaswini Lonari
Thagubothu Ramesh
Vennela Kishore as Vennela Kishore
Posani Krishna Murali
Fish Venkat
 Cameo appearances
 Nani as himself
 Allari Naresh as himself
 Shraddha Das as a goon
 Manchu Manoj as himself
 Tanish as Michael

Soundtrack 
The songs are composed by Sai Karthik. In a review of the songs, a critic stated that "All in all, Superstar Kidnap looks like an experimental album with good sound production values and mix of various genres. However, Sai Karthik could have struck a better balance between mass tracks and duets".
"Superstar Kidnap" - Ranjith
"Oh Na Manasa" - Naresh Iyer (lyrics by Kittu Vissapragada)
"Aase Paddadu"  - Gana Bala
"Ola Ola" - Ranjith

Release 
The Hindu wrote that "It is not a great movie, but go without expectations and you might not entirely regret watching the film".

References

External links 

Indian comedy films
2015 comedy films
2010s Telugu-language films
Films about kidnapping
Films scored by Sai Karthik